The Inawongga were an Aboriginal Australian people of the Pilbara region of Western Australia.

Country
Their southeastern extension ran along the upper Ashburton River from Turee Creek to the Angelo River, and north of Mount Vernon Station.

Running clockwise from due north, their neighbours were the Kurrama to their northwest, the Panyjima north-northeast, the Mandara due east, the Ngarlawongga to their southeast, the Ninanu directly south and the Tjururo on their western flank.

Alternative spelling
 Inawangga.

Notes

Citations

Sources

Aboriginal peoples of Western Australia